Restrepia dodsonii, commonly called the Dodson's restrepia, is a species of orchid endemic to Ecuador (Pichincha).

References

External links 

dodsonii
Endemic orchids of Ecuador
Pichincha Province